Powell is an unincorporated community in Jefferson County, Nebraska, United States.

History
Powell was laid out  by the Powell family when it was certain that the railroad would be extended to that point. A post office was established at Powell in the 1880s.

References

Unincorporated communities in Jefferson County, Nebraska
Unincorporated communities in Nebraska